Eupithecia lobbichlerata is a moth in the family Geometridae. It is found in Nepal.

References

Moths described in 1961
lobbichlerata
Moths of Asia